The World Exchange Plaza is an office and retail complex in Downtown Ottawa, Ontario, Canada. Consisting of two towers and an outdoor plaza, it covers an entire city block between Metcalfe and O'Connor Streets south of Queen and north of Albert Street.

The first phase of the project was completed in 1991. At the time, the twenty-story building was unusual in Ottawa for its visual flair. The eastern side was marked by a large plaza modeled after the Roman Colosseum. The building opened in the middle of a deep recession and initially had trouble being filled. Still, work began on a second tower, which was completed in 2001. This second tower greatly increased the available office space.

The two towers hold offices for a variety of companies, including Deloitte, Borden Ladner Gervais (BLG), CTV, Microsoft, Accenture, Norton Rose Fulbright, RBC Dominion Securities, TD Canada Trust, CPAC and Beer Canada. Atop of one tower is the TD logo and atop the other is the BLG logo. The building also houses the  Embassy of Mexico to Canada.

The World Exchange Plaza contains a small shopping mall located on the ground floor. The mall featured five life-size models of narwhals and belugas that hung from the ceiling. The models were made and donated by the Canadian Museum of Nature and were unveiled on October 29, 1991 in the presence of Princess Diana. In preparation for an extensive renovation of the plaza's ground floor, the sculptures were given back to the Canadian Museum of Nature on November 10, 2021.

The complex also featured a movie theatre, the only cinema in the downtown core. The theatre was run by Cineplex Odeon from its opening in 1991 until September 30, 2005 when it was bought by Empire Theatres who operated the theatre until October 29, 2013. The theatre closed on December 29, 2013 when Landmark Cinemas was unable to renew the lease. The space was then converted into office space. On Jan 24, 2017 it was announced that  Klipfolio Dashboard would become the first major tenant of this newly renovated space.

The complex is managed by QuadReal on behalf of the British Columbia Investment Management Corporation (bcIMC).

Gallery

References

External links

Tenant Info

Buildings and structures in Ottawa
Tourist attractions in Ottawa
Office buildings completed in 1991
Office buildings completed in 2001